Thiago Ferreira Lopes (born 27 October 1996), known as Thiago Lopes, is a Brazilian professional footballer who plays for Vitória, on loan from Sport. Mainly a midfielder, he can also play as a right back.

Career
Thiago Lopes was in the youth ranks at Coritiba since 2011, and was called-up to the first team after impressing coach Ney Franco in a friendly match between the youth and first teams in early 2015. He made his first team debut on 19 August 2015, in the 2015 Copa do Brasil Round of 16 match against Grêmio, coming on as a substitute in the second half. His national league debut came as a starter on 6 September against Avaí in 2015 Campeonato Brasileiro Série A. His first senior goal for the club came in a 2016 Campeonato Paranaense game against Athletico Paranaense on 20 March 2016.

In May 2017, having lost his place in the Coritiba team, he was loaned to state rivals Londrina to play in the latter stages of the 2017 Primeira Liga and the 2017 Campeonato Brasileiro Série B.

In 2018 his season was marred by a number of injuries, and he didn't play between September 2018 and March 2019.

He is currently contracted to the club until December 2021.

Career statistics

References

External links

Thiago Lopes profile at Coritiba official site

1996 births
Living people
Footballers from São Paulo (state)
Brazilian footballers
Association football midfielders
Campeonato Brasileiro Série A players
Campeonato Brasileiro Série B players
Coritiba Foot Ball Club players
Londrina Esporte Clube players
People from Mogi Mirim